The 1974 Football League Cup Final was the final match of the 1973–74 Football League Cup, the 14th season of the Football League Cup, a football competition for the 92 teams in The Football League. The match was played at Wembley Stadium on 2 March 1974, and was contested by two First Division clubs, Manchester City and Wolverhampton Wanderers.

Wolves won the match 2–1 with goals from Kenny Hibbitt and John Richards. Colin Bell had equalised for Manchester City. This gave the Midlanders their first major silverware since lifting the 1960 FA Cup.

Match details

Road to Wembley

Manchester City

Wolverhampton Wanderers

References

EFL Cup Finals
League Cup Final 1974
League Cup Final 1974
1973–74 Football League
Football League Cup Final
Football League Cup Final